The 2006 College Nationals was the 11th Men's and Women's College Nationals.  The College Nationals was a team handball tournament to determine the College National Champion from 2006 from the US.

Final ranking
Source:

Men's ranking

Women's ranking

References

USA Team Handball College Nationals by year